Kushk-e Khaleseh may refer to:
 Kushk-e Khaleseh-ye Bala
 Kushk-e Khaleseh-ye Pain